Welcome is an unincorporated community in Griffin Township, Pope County, Arkansas, United States. It is located at the intersection of Welcome Home Road and Pine Street, east of Hector.

References

Unincorporated communities in Pope County, Arkansas
Unincorporated communities in Arkansas